A Dozen Tough Jobs is a novella by Howard Waldrop which retells the Twelve Labors of Hercules in the Depression-era American South. It was a Nebula Award finalist.

References
A Dozen Tough Jobs Mark V Ziesing, 1989,

External links

Novels by Howard Waldrop
1989 science fiction novels
1989 American novels
American novellas
Great Depression novels